"You Make Me Feel So Good" is the third single released by the American synth-pop band Book of Love. The song was included on the band's eponymous debut album Book of Love in 1986. The song was written by band members Susan Ottaviano and Ted Ottaviano.

Although "You Make Me Feel So Good" failed to reach the Billboard Hot 100 chart, it became Book of Love's first CHR radio hit. The song was remixed for the single by Jellybean and Ivan Ivan.  For the 12" single, album track "Lost Souls" was remixed and extended by Mark Kamins. Also appearing on the 12" single is the 'Full Bloom Version' of "I Touch Roses" which was remixed by Depeche Mode producer and Mute Records founder, Daniel Miller.

A video was filmed for "You Make Me Feel So Good" and released to promote the album. (See External links for video)

Track listings

1986 7" Single   (Sire Records 7-28685)
Side A:
"You Make Me Feel So Good" - 3:58

Side B:
"Lost Souls" - 4:28

1986 7" Promo Single   (Sire Records 7-28685-A)
Side A:
"You Make Me Feel So Good" (Remix) - 3:58

Side B:
"You Make Me Feel So Good" (Remix) - 3:58

1986 12" Maxi-Single   (Sire Records 0-20474)
Side A: 
"You Make Me Feel So Good" (Flutter Mix) - 6:01
"Lost Souls" (Spirited Mix) - 6:46
Side B:
"I Touch Roses" (Full Bloom Version) - 5:35
"You Make Me Feel So Good" (Dub Mix) - 3:58

Personnel 
Written by Susan Ottaviano and Theodore Ottaviano. All instruments arranged, programmed, and performed by Book of Love.

 Susan Ottaviano - Lead vocals
 Jade Lee - Percussion
 Lauren Roselli - Keyboards
 Ted Ottaviano - Keyboards, melodica

Credits
 Produced by Ivan Ivan
 "You Make Me Feel So Good" (Flutter Mix)Remixed by Jellybean and Ivan IvanRemix Engineer: "Doc" DoughertyAssistant Engineer: Mark RouleRemixed at Sigma Sound Studios, NYC
 "Lost Souls" (Spirited Mix) Remixed by Mark Kamins
 "I Touch Roses" (Full Bloom Version) Remixed by Daniel Miller
 "You Make Me Feel So Good" (Dub Mix) Remixed by Jellybean and Ivan Ivan

Official versions

" * " denotes that version is available as digital download

References

External links 
 

Book of Love (band) songs
1986 singles
1986 songs
Sire Records singles